Lingguang Temple is a Buddhist temple located in Meixian District of Meizhou, Guangdong, China.

History
The temple traces its origins to the former "Shengshou Temple", founded by master Pan Liaoquan in the Xiantong period (860–874) of the Tang dynasty (618–907), and would later become "Lingguang Temple" in 1385 during the reign of Hongwu Emperor (1368–1398) at the dawn of Ming dynasty (1368–1644).

Architecture
The complex include the following halls: Mahavira Hall, Hall of Four Heavenly Kings (Shanmen), Zhutian Hall, Bell tower, Drum tower, Hall of Guru, Dharma Hall, Meditation Hall, Dining Room, etc.

Hall of Four Heavenly Kings
Maitreya is enshrined in the Hall of Four Heavenly Kings and at the back of his statue is a statue of Skanda. Statues of Four Heavenly Kings are enshrined in the left and right sides.

Mahavira Hall
Statue of Pan Liaoquan is enshrined in front of the hall. In the middle are statues of Thousand Armed and Eyed Guanyin, Ksitigarbha and Mulian. Statue of Guanyin is placed at the back of the hall.

Zhutian Hall
The Zhutian Hall enshrining the Twenty-four Heavenlies

National Treasure
The Bell tower houses a bronze bell which was cast in 1485, in the reign of Chenghua Emperor of the Ming dynasty weighing . A Chinese couple are carved in the outside.

References

Buddhist temples in Guangdong
Buildings and structures in Meizhou
Tourist attractions in Meizhou
14th-century establishments in China
14th-century Buddhist temples
Religious buildings and structures completed in 1385